The 1997 Abierto Mexicano de Tenis, also known by its sponsored name Abierto Mexicano Telcel, was a men's tennis tournament played on outdoor clay courts in Mexico City, Mexico and was part of the World Series of the 1997 ATP Tour. It was the fifth edition of the tournament and took place from 20 October through 26 October 1997. First-seeded Francisco Clavet won the singles title.

Finals

Singles

 Francisco Clavet defeated  Juan Albert Viloca 6–4, 7–6(9–7)
 It was Clavet's 1st singles title of the year and the 4th of his career.

Doubles

 Nicolás Lapentti /  Daniel Orsanic defeated  Luis Herrera /  Mariano Sánchez 4–6, 6–3, 7–6

References

External links
 Official website 
 ATP tournament profile
 ITF tournament edition details

Abierto Mexicano de Tenis
Mexican Open (tennis)
1997 in Mexican tennis